Khumi, or Khumi Chin, is a Kuki-Chin-Mizo language of Burma, with some speakers across the border in Bangladesh.

Geographical distribution
Khumi proper is spoken in the following townships of Myanmar (Ethnologue).
Kaladan river area in Paletwa township, Chin State
A few villages in Kyauktaw township, Rakhine State.

Eastern Khumi (Khami) is spoken in the following townships of Myanmar (Ethnologue).
Matupi township, Chin State (in 4 villages)
Sami subtownship, Paletwa township, Chin State (in 85 villages)

Dialects
Ethnologue lists the following dialects.

Khumi
Pi Chaung
Kaladan
Eastern Kaladan
Southern Paletwa
Eastern Khumi (Khami)
Nisay (Nise, Palyng, Tao Cha)
Nideun (Amlai, Ghu, Laungtha, Maru, Paru, Tahaensae, Taheunso, Uiphaw)
Lemi (Akelong, Aki Along, Kaja, Kajauk)
Khongtu
Likhy (Likhaeng)
Rengcaa (Namboi, Nangbwe)
Khenlak
Asang (Kasang, Sangtha)

The Kasang (also known as Khenlak, Ta-aw, Hkongsa-Asang, Hkongso-Asang, Asang, and Sangta) consider themselves as ethnic Hkongso, but their language is intelligible with Khumi rather than Anu or Hkongso (Wright 2009). Kasang villages include Lamoitong and Tuirong.

References

Herr, Kristen. 2011. The Phonological Interpretation of Minor Syllables, Applied to Lemi Chin. Master’s thesis.
Lung, K Nu San. 2017. Vitality of Language and Music among the Lemi People In Southern Chin State of Myanmar. Master’s Thesis.
Peterson, David A. 2012. The Khumi cluster and its place in Kuki-Chin-Mizo. Paper presented at ICSTLL 45, Singapore.

Kuki-Chin languages
Languages of Bangladesh
Languages of Myanmar